Holborough to Burham Marshes is a  biological Site of Special Scientific Interest  Kent. Holborough Marshes and Burham Marsh are managed by the Kent Wildlife Trust.

This site is in the tidal flood plain of the River Medway. It has diverse habitats, with reedbeds, fen, grassland, woodland, scrub and a flooded gravel pit, which attracts wintering wildfowl. There are five rare invertebrates, including three bee species.

There is public access to Holborough Marshes.

References

Sites of Special Scientific Interest in Kent